This List of Russian steam locomotive classes includes those built both before and during the Soviet era. They are to the gauge of  unless otherwise stated. Class letters are shown in Cyrillic characters, followed by romanized characters in the next column. For more information, see Romanization of Russian. The main source for this list is Fleming and Price.

Locomotive built before 1925

Locomotives built after 1925

Captured locomotives

Locomotive builders
Reference
 Kolomna, Moscow, founded 1862
 Nevsky, Saint Petersburg, first locomotive 1870
 Briansk, Moscow, founded 1873
 Kirov Plant (or Putilov), Saint Petersburg, first locomotive 1894
 Kharkov Locomotive Factory, first locomotive 1897
 Sormovo Factory, Nizhny Novgorod,  first locomotive 1898

See also
 History of rail transport in Russia
 Rail transport in the Soviet Union
Russian Railway Museum, in St.Petersburg

References

 
 
Steam locomotive classes